Mala Štanga (Stangen) is a small dispersed settlement in the Municipality of Šmartno pri Litiji in central Slovenia. It lies in the Sava Hills west of Litija. The area is part of the historical region of Lower Carniola. The municipality is now included in the Central Slovenia Statistical Region. 

An Early Iron Age hillfort has been identified on a hill to the east of the settlement, although the usual associated burial ground has yet to be found.

References

External links
Mala Štanga at Geopedia

Populated places in the Municipality of Šmartno pri Litiji